Lugan may refer to:

Places 
 Lugano, a city in the canton of Ticino, Lugano
 Lugan, Aveyron, a commune in the Aveyron Department, France
 Lugan, Tarn, a commune in the Tarn Department, France
 Luhan (river), a river in Ukraine

Names 
 Lugan an ethnic slur for a Lithuanian

People 
 Bernard Lugan